Helga Stephenson,  is a Canadian film industry executive, who served as CEO of the Academy of Canadian Cinema and Television from 2011 to 2016. Following her departure from the Academy, she was made a member of the Order of Ontario.

Background
Stephenson was born and raised in Montreal, Quebec. Her aunt was the wife of John David Eaton. She studied film and communications at McGill University, graduating in 1969, and travelled to work internationally for some time before joining the National Arts Centre as a publicist.

Career

Festival of Festivals
She later worked in Toronto as a partner in a film and television publicity agency, before joining the Festival of Festivals in 1978. In 1980, she was coproducer with Henk Van der Kolk and Bill Marshall of Hank Williams: The Show He Never Gave.

In 1982, she was promoted to communications director of the festival.

In September 1986 she was appointed interim director of the festival after the board dismissed Leonard Schein, and she was named the permanent new director in December. She remained in the role until 1994, when she stepped down and was succeeded by Piers Handling. Her term as director of the festival was widely credited with securing its contemporary reputation as one of the world's most prestigious film festivals.

She stepped down shortly after the festival changed its name from Festival of Festivals to the Toronto International Film Festival.

Other activities
She then became chair of Viacom Canada, and an on-air host of film-related programming for Showcase. She remained with Showcase until 1996, and with Viacom until 2000.

In the 2000s, Stephenson and Kate Alexander Daniels launched the public relations firm Daniels Stephenson, which handled film publicity and produced the Toronto Film Critics Association Awards, and cofounded the Human Rights Watch International Film Festival with Brenda Dinnick.

Academy of Canadian Cinema and Television
Stephenson was named interim CEO of the Academy of Canadian Cinema and Television in 2011, and was confirmed in the position in 2012. In the position, she implemented changes to the Academy's board structure and media relations strategies in response to widespread dissatisfaction with the Academy among members, and spearheaded the merger of the Genie Awards and the Gemini Awards into the contemporary Canadian Screen Awards.

She stepped down as CEO of the Academy in 2016, and was succeeded by Beth Janson.

References

External links

Chief executive officers of the Academy of Canadian Cinema & Television
Canadian people of Icelandic descent
Canadian people of Irish descent
Canadian television hosts
Living people
McGill University alumni
People from Montreal
Canadian public relations people
Members of the Order of Ontario
Toronto International Film Festival people
Film producers from Quebec
Canadian women television personalities
Canadian women film producers
Officers of the Order of Canada
Year of birth missing (living people)